Alejandro Antonio "Tony" Taylor (born July 13, 1989) is a Panamanian professional footballer who plays as a striker.

Born in the United States, his parents are of Panamanian descent and he was called up to the Panama national football team for the first time in September 2016.

Club career

Youth and amateur
Taylor was born in Long Beach, California, but grew up in Jacksonville, Florida, and attended Bishop Kenny High School, moving on to play one year of college soccer at the University of South Florida, before transferring to Jacksonville University as a sophomore. As a Dolphin, Taylor helped the team achieve one of the best seasons in the program's history. In 2008, with the help of Taylor, the Dolphins went 7–2 in the Atlantic Sun and won the conference tournament. In the NCAA tournament the Dolphins defeated Louisville in their first round matchup with Taylor providing a goal and an assist. He left Jacksonville after his sophomore year, and travelled to Europe intending to turn professional. He trained with Norwegian club IK Start, playing in a pre-season friendly, before signing with Traffic Sports of Brazil.

During his college years Taylor played for the Central Florida Kraze in the USL Premier Development League, netting 10 goals in seven games, and being named finalist for U-19 PDL player of the year. He was also a member of Jacksonville-based USASA club Lynch's FC's run to the first round of the US Open Cup in 2009.

Professional
In December 2009 Traffic announced that they would be loaning Taylor to Estoril Praia. He made his league debut on April 18, 2010 against Penafiel and scored his first goal the following weekend in a 1–0 win against Aves. Taylor went out on loan to Atletico CP from August until December 2011. Taylor returned to Estoril Praia after his loan spell but did  not renew his contract with the club following the 2012–13 season. In August 2014 Taylor was acquired by the New England Revolution of the MLS through a weighted lottery. In December 2014, Taylor was selected by New York City FC as their 5th pick (and 10th overall pick) in the 2014 expansion draft, having been left unprotected by the New England Revolution. On February 10, 2015, Taylor scored the second goal in NYCFC's inaugural pre-season friendly against St Mirren, the game ended 2–0 in New York's favour.

Taylor's option was not exercised by NYCFC at the end of the 2016 season. On January 31, 2017, Taylor joined Primeira Liga side Paços de Ferreira. Taylor was signed by Jacksonville Armada FC on July 28, 2017.

On February 26, 2018 Taylor signed with the Ottawa Fury in the United Soccer League.

International career
Taylor played with the United States U-20s, participating in the 2009 FIFA U-20 World Cup.  He also played with the United States U-23 Olympic Qualifying team participating in the 2012 CONCACAF Olympic Qualifying Tournament.

In September 2016, Taylor was called up for the first time to the Panama national football team for a friendly against Mexico national football team on October 11, 2016. Both of Taylor's parents are Panamanian-born. Taylor debuted for Panama in a 0–0 2018 World Cup qualification tie against Mexico. In January 2017, Taylor played two matches for Panama at the 2017 Copa Centroamericana.

Career statistics

Club

International

References

External links
Tony Taylor's Official Website

1989 births
Living people
People with acquired Panamanian citizenship
Panamanian footballers
Panama international footballers
American soccer players
United States men's under-20 international soccer players
United States men's under-23 international soccer players
American sportspeople of Panamanian descent
American people of Panamanian descent
South Florida Bulls men's soccer players
Jacksonville Dolphins men's soccer players
Orlando City U-23 players
G.D. Estoril Praia players
Atlético Clube de Portugal players
AC Omonia players
New England Revolution players
New York City FC players
F.C. Paços de Ferreira players
Jacksonville Armada FC players
Ottawa Fury FC players
Puskás Akadémia FC players
People from Long Beach, California
Soccer players from Long Beach, California
Soccer players from Jacksonville, Florida
USL League Two players
Major League Soccer players
Liga Portugal 2 players
Cypriot First Division players
Primeira Liga players
North American Soccer League players
USL Championship players
Panamanian expatriate footballers
American expatriate soccer players
Panamanian expatriate sportspeople in Canada
American expatriate sportspeople in Portugal
American expatriate sportspeople in Cyprus
American expatriate sportspeople in Canada
American expatriate sportspeople in Hungary
Expatriate footballers in Cyprus
Expatriate footballers in Portugal
Expatriate soccer players in Canada
Expatriate footballers in Hungary
2017 Copa Centroamericana players
Bishop Kenny High School alumni
Association football forwards
San Antonio FC players